Battlefields of Asura is the eighth studio album from Taiwanese melodic death metal band Chthonic. It was released on October 12, 2018, in North America. The album features guest vocals from Randy Blythe and Denise Ho.

Reception

Track listing
Battlefields of Asura album track listing adapted from Allmusic.

Personnel
Battlefields of Asura album personnel adapted from Allmusic.

Chthonic
Freddy Lim, "Left Face of Maradou" – vocals, composer
Jesse Liu, "the Infernal" – guitar
Doris Yeh, "Thunder Tears" – bass
Dani Wang, "Azathothian Hands" – drums
CJ Kao, "Dispersed Fingers" – keyboards, synthesizer

References

External links
Official website

Chthonic (band) albums
2018 albums